The 2022 Canadian Championship was the fifteenth edition of Canada's national soccer cup tournament, awarding the Voyageurs Cup. It took place from May 10 to July 26, 2022. The winners of the tournament, Vancouver Whitecaps FC, were awarded the Voyageurs Cup and earned a berth in the 2023 CONCACAF Champions League.

Format 
The competition followed a similar format to the 2021 edition with ten teams starting in the preliminary round and three teams receiving byes to the quarter-finals. CF Montréal and Toronto FC received byes for being the finalists of the 2021 tournament and Pacific FC received a bye for winning the 2021 Canadian Premier League season. Each tie of the four round tournament was played as a single-leg fixture.

Distribution

Qualified clubs
Qualification to the Canadian Championship for 2022 was automatic for Canadian teams within Major League Soccer and for all teams within the Canadian Premier League, Canada's tier-one national league. The champions from Canada's two regional pro-am leagues (League1 Ontario and PLSQ) also qualified.

Note
 Statistics include previous incarnations of FC Edmonton, Montreal Impact, and Vancouver Whitecaps
 Results from the 2020 Canadian Championship are included for Toronto FC and Forge FC even though the championship was played after the start of the 2022 edition

Schedule and draw
Teams were divided into four geographical pots for the draw. In the preliminary round, teams in pot 1 were drawn with teams in pot 1 while teams in pot 2 were drawn with a team in pot 2 or pot 3. For the quarter-finals, the winners from pot 1 faced off while the winners from pot 2 and 3 were drawn against teams from pot 4. The draw also determined hosting rights for all four rounds.

Bracket
The draw for the Canadian Championship was streamed live on OneSoccer on March 9, 2022.

Preliminary round

Summary
The preliminary round matches were played on May 10 and 11, 2022.

|}

Matches

Quarter-finals

Summary
The quarter-final matches were played on May 24 and 25, 2022.

|}

Matches

Semi-finals

Summary
The semi-final matches were played on June 22, 2022.

|}

Matches

Final

Awards

 George Gross Memorial Trophy:  Ryan Gauld
 Best Young Canadian Player Award:  Ryan Raposo

Top goalscorers

Discipline

Cautions
  

Note: Players receive a one-match ban for yellow card accumulation based on two cautions in Canadian Championship.

Sending offs

References

2022
2022 in Canadian soccer
2022 domestic association football cups
2022 North American domestic association football cups